The 2008 South Dakota Republican presidential primary took place on June 3, 2008.

Results

See also
 2008 South Dakota Democratic presidential primary
 2008 Republican Party presidential primaries

References

South Dakota
2008 South Dakota elections
South Dakota Republican primaries